St. Paul Baptist Church is a historic Baptist church in St. Albans, West Virginia, United States.  It was built in 1921 and is a two-story brick building in the Late Gothic Revival style.  It features a square corner tower.  It has a ground level fellowship hall and elevated first floor sanctuary.  It was built to serve a growing African American population in St. Albans.

It was listed on the National Register of Historic Places in 1998.

References

20th-century Baptist churches in the United States
African-American history of West Virginia
Baptist churches in West Virginia
Churches in Kanawha County, West Virginia
Gothic Revival church buildings in West Virginia
National Register of Historic Places in Kanawha County, West Virginia
Churches on the National Register of Historic Places in West Virginia
Churches completed in 1921
St. Albans, West Virginia